NZRA can refer to:
 New Zealand Rocketry Association
 Raglan Aerodrome, Raglan, New Zealand
 Republican Association of New Zealand